The following lists the number one singles on the New Zealand Singles Chart during the 1990s. The source for this decade is the Recorded Music NZ chart, the chart history of which can be found on the Recorded Music NZ website or Charts.nz.

A total of 179 singles topped the chart in the 1990s, including 20 by New Zealand artists. Nine artists had three or more number-one singles; the most successful was Mariah Carey, who spent 20 weeks at number one with seven different singles; however, Michael Jackson spent 22 weeks at number one with six different singles. Boyz II Men reached number one four times, and those who peaked atop the chart three times were Boyzone, Blackstreet, Spice Girls, Janet Jackson, U2, and Deep Obsession—the New Zealand act with the most number-one singles during the decade.

Whitney Houston's cover of Dolly Parton's "I Will Always Love You" spent the most weeks at number one, claiming the number-one position for 14 weeks between December 1992 and March 1993 (this includes a three-week period in which no charts were published due to the Christmas and New Year holiday periods). "(I Can't Help) Falling in Love with You" by UB40 held the top position for 11 weeks, and the New Zealand act that spent the most weeks at number one during the 1990s was Push Push, who topped the listing for six weeks in 1991 with "Trippin'".

Key
 – Number-one single of the year
 – Song of New Zealand origin

 ← 1980s
 1990
 1991
 1992
 1993
 1994
 1995
 1996
 1997
 1998
 1999
 2000s →

1990

1991

1992

1993

1994

1995

1996

1997

1998

1999

Artists with the most number-one songs

Key
 – Song of New Zealand origin

Excluded statistics
1 Boyzone's tally does not include Ronan Keating's solo single, "When You Say Nothing At All".
2 The Spice Girls' tally does not include Geri Halliwell's solo single, "Look At Me".
 While some artists made appearances in other artists songs, these songs were not included in their groups tally. This includes, Robin and Ali Campbell featuring in Pato Banton's single, "Baby Come Back" as they were featured together, not as part of UB40.
 *Some artists who had solo number-one singles (or was a featured artist in a number-one single) and who were also part of a group that had number-one single(s) have been classed as separate entries. This includes Che Fu, who had one solo number-one and featured in another number-one single, and Supergroove, who had one a number-one single prior to Che Fu leaving the group, as well as Lauryn Hill and Pras Michel, who both had a solo number one single, and the Fugees, which had two number-one singles prior to the release of their solo singles.

Most weeks at number one

Key
 – Song of New Zealand origin

Notes

References

See also
Music of New Zealand
List of UK Singles Chart number ones of the 1990s
List of Billboard number-one singles
List of number-one singles in Australia during the 1990s

Number-one singles
New Zealand Singles
1990